Deh-e Negari (also Romanized as Deh-e Negārī) is a village in Kuh Panj Rural District, in the Central District of Bardsir County, Kerman Province, Iran. At the 2006 census, its population was 12, in 7 families.

References 

Populated places in Bardsir County